Adoxophyes panurga is a species of moth of the family Tortricidae first described by Józef Razowski in 2013. It is found on Seram Island in Indonesia. The habitat consists of lower montane forests and alluvial forests.

The wingspan is about 22 mm. The forewings are whitish, somewhat spotted with brownish and with weak brownish suffusions. The markings are rust brown, spotted with dark brown along the edges. The hindwings are whitish.

Etymology
The species name refers to the colouration of the species and is derived from Greek panurgos (meaning well shaped).

References

Moths described in 2013
Adoxophyes
Moths of Indonesia